Human placentophagy, or consumption of the placenta, is defined as "the ingestion of a human placenta postpartum, at any time, by any person, either in raw or altered (e.g., cooked, dried, steeped in liquid) form". While there are several anecdotes of different cultures practicing placentophagy in varying contexts, maternal placentophagy started in the US in the 1970s, with little to no evidence of its practice in any traditional or historic culture. Midwives and alternative-health advocates in the U.S. are the primary groups encouraging post-partum maternal placentophagy.

Maternal placentophagy has a small following in Western cultures, fostered by celebrities like January Jones. Human placentophagy after childbirth is touted by some as a treatment for postpartum depression and fatigue, among other health benefits, given its high protein, rich iron and nutrient content. However, scientific research is inconclusive as to whether consuming the placenta prevents or treats postpartum depression or to any other health benefits. The risks of human placentophagy are also still unclear, but there has been one confirmed case of an infant needing hospitalization due to a group B strep blood infection tied to their mother's consumption of placenta capsules.

Placentophagy can be divided into two categories, maternal placentophagy and non-maternal placentophagy.

Maternal placentophagy
Maternal placentophagy is defined as "a mother’s ingestion of her own placenta postpartum, in any form, at any time".  Of the more than 4000 species of placental mammals, most, including herbivores, regularly engage in maternal placentophagy, thought to be an instinct to hide any trace of childbirth from predators in the wild. The exceptions to placentophagy include mainly humans, Pinnipedia, Cetacea, and camels.

Ingestion in time period immediately after birth 
Midwifery practices anecdotally document the practice of consumption of a small portion of the raw placenta with honey to resolve postpartum hemorrhage, succeeding in instances where conventional administration of Pitocin did not fully resolve bleeding.

Ingestion in postpartum period 
Preparation of the placenta for consumption can include domestic culinary recipes such as for pâté, or may involve outsourcing to encapsulation specialists for the freezing, cooking, and drying of the placenta, and crushing it into pill form. There is the question of whether the drying process affects the potentially beneficial proteins and hormones; there has even been one specific case in which a newborn developed sepsis after the mother consumed contaminated capsules and the centre for disease control thus issued a warning behind the practice.
Mothers planning on keeping their placentas after birthing in hospitals may need to check with hospital policies regarding authorization to do so.

Non-maternal placentophagy
Non-maternal placentophagy is defined as "the ingestion of the placenta by any person other than the mother, at any time".  Such instances of placentophagy have been attributed to the following: a shift toward carnivorousness at parturition, specific hunger, and general hunger. With most Eutherian mammals, the placenta is consumed postpartum by the mother. Historically, humans more commonly consume the placenta of another woman under special circumstances.

Historical occurrences of human placentophagy
In a 1979 volume of the Bulletin of the New York Academy of Medicine, William Ober's article "Notes on Placentophagy" evaluates the possibility that certain ancient cultures that practiced human sacrifice may also have practiced human placentophagy, including Egyptians, Tasians, Badarians, Amrateans, Gerzeans, Semainians. However, a 2010 survey of 179 societies found that none practices placentophagy regularly. A 2007 study similarly found that placentophagy has never been described as a culturally normative practice in any historical source.

Placentophagy might have occurred during the Siege of Jerusalem (587 BC), due to the excessive famine experienced by the Judeans, according to scholar Jack Miles in his Pulitzer Prize-winning God: A Biography.

In early Brazil, there is extensive reportage of cannibalism among the Tupinamba. It is recorded about the natives of the captaincy of Sergipe in Brazil: "They eat human flesh when they can get it, and if a woman miscarries devour the abortive immediately. If she goes her time out, she herself cuts the navel-string with a shell, which she boils along with the secondine [i.e. placenta], and eats them both."

Decline of maternal placentophagy in humans 
From an evolutionary perspective, it appears that the human species must have stopped practicing maternal placentophagy at a fairly early stage, since there is no evidence that it has ever been common. One hypothesis that has been offered is that the smoke of firewood caused environmental toxins to accumulate in the placenta, leading to harmful health outcomes for prehistoric mothers who stayed close to the community hearth and ate their placentas. However, there is no direct evidence for a taboo against placentophagy in human myth. The shift away from placentophagy may have occurred over one million years before present.

Traditional medicine 
Human placenta has been used traditionally in Chinese medicine, though the mother is not identified as the recipient of these treatments.  A sixteenth-century Chinese medical text, the Compendium of Materia Medica, states in a section on medical uses of the placenta that, "when a woman in Liuqiu has a baby, the placenta is eaten", and that in Bagui, "the placenta of a boy is specially prepared and eaten by the mother’s family and relatives." Another Chinese medical text, the Great Pharmacopoeia of 1596, recommends placental tissue mixed with human milk to help overcome the effects of Ch'i exhaustion. These include "anemia, weakness of the extremities, and coldness of the sexual organs with involuntary ejaculation of semen". Dried, powdered placenta would be stirred into three wine-cups of milk to make a Connected Destiny Elixir.  The elixir would be warmed in sunlight, then taken as treatment.  It is not known exactly how traditional this remedy was, nor exactly how far back it dates.

Ober also identified many cultures known to have practiced placentophagy for medicinal purposes, and one for its flavor.

The Araucanian Native Americans of Argentina dried and ground a child's umbilical cord, giving the child a little of the powder when it was sick. In Jamaica, bits of placental membranes were put into an infant's tea to prevent convulsions caused by ghosts. In ancient Egypt, as well, pieces of placenta were soaked in milk and fed to the infant to test for infant mortality.

The Chaga of Tanganyika place the placenta in a receptacle for two months to dry. Once dry, it is ground into flour from which a porridge is made.  The porridge is served to old women of the family as a way of preserving the child's life.

In Central India, women of the Kol Tribe eat placenta to aid reproductive function. It is believed that consumption of placenta by a childless woman "may dispel the influences that keep her barren".

The Kurtachi of the Solomon Islands mixed placenta into the mother's supply of powdered lime for chewing with the areca nut.

In the Maremma region of Italy it was at one time common to mix pieces of placenta into the food of a new mother without her knowledge, to promote a healthy flow of milk.

Cultural and spiritual beliefs 
Beliefs behind the practices of consuming the placenta, whether in part or in whole, commonly reflect acknowledgment for the vast work of this organ for the baby in utero, serving as its 'protector' and providing critical vital functions for the baby before birth. The placenta can be seen as the Tree of Life, as a genetic 'twin' to the fetus, an angel, and reasons for ingesting the placenta may reflect spiritual beliefs as much as the pragmatic ones listed above. Traditional practices to revere and honor the placenta that do not include consumption may include placenta burial, such as in Saudi Arabia. Such traditions reflect human birthing practices wherein umbilical cords may not have been severed while the cord is still pulsing, avoiding blood loss and infection, and may include practices that retain the placental connection until after it has been delivered and the baby is already nursing.

Modern placentophagy

Modern practice of placentophagy is rare, as most contemporary human cultures do not promote its consumption. Placentophagy did receive popular culture attention in 2012, however, when American actress January Jones credited eating her placenta as helping her get back to work on the set of Mad Men after just six weeks.

Midwife, birthing center founder, and author Robin Lim accounts for the medical use of eating a small portion of the placenta accompanied by some honey to successfully control postpartum hemorrhage. There are anecdotal reports of this working after herbal remedies or the typical administration of oxytocin only temporarily stopped bleeding. 

Instances of placentophagy have been recorded among certain modern cultures.  In the 1960s "male and female Vietnamese nurses and midwives of Chinese and Thai background consum[ed] the placentas of their young, healthy patients" for reasons unspecified, as reported by a Czechoslovakian medical officer in at the Hospital of Czechoslovak-Vietnamese Friendship in Haiphong. Placentas were stripped of their membranous parts and fried with onions before being eaten.

A more recent cross-cultural ethnographic study by researchers at the University of Nevada, Las Vegas surveyed 179 contemporary human societies, and identified only one culture (Chicano, or Mexican-American) that mentioned the practice of maternal placentophagy. This account, centering on Chicano and Anglo midwifery in San Antonio, Texas, stated, "cooking and eating part of the placenta has…been reported by a couple of midwives. One Anglo mother ... was reported to have roasted the placenta." This instance, however, may not be indicative of any larger cultural trends, as no other records of placentophagy were found in the Chicano culture.  This same study also recorded three references of non-maternal placentophagy:

Traditional Gullah medicine dictates that when a baby is born with a caul, with amniotic membranes over the face at birth, the placenta is made into a tea and then consumed by the child to "prevent them from seeing spirits that would otherwise haunt [them]".
Practice of paternal placentophagy was identified in the Malekula of Melanesia.  "In Espiritu Santo, the new father [eats] a pudding made from the cooked placenta and blood."
Oral administration of the placenta was reported in Sino-Vietnamese medicine to aid the recovery of those suffering from tuberculosis.

In a follow-up study, the UNLV researchers were joined by colleagues at the University of South Florida, and surveyed women who had engaged in maternal placentophagy previously. Of the 189 placentophagic women surveyed, the researchers found that 95 percent of participants had "positive" or "very positive" subjective experiences from eating their own placenta, citing beliefs of "improved mood", "increased energy", and "improved lactation".
 The authors themselves, however, state that "exceedingly little research has been conducted to assess these claims and no systematic analysis has been performed to evaluate the experiences of women who engage in this behavior." In the United States as many as 30% of women who planned community births may consume the placenta, often citing avoidance of postpartum depression as the reason.

Recent examples of placentophagy in the popular media include Time Magazine’s "Afterbirth:  It’s What’s for Dinner", and USA Today’s "Ingesting the placenta: Is it healthy for new moms?"

Current beliefs among placentophagists

Nutritional benefits
During pregnancy, women often become iron deficient because iron is transported across the placenta to the fetus. Because low levels of iron are known to negatively affect mood, researchers are exploring the possible link between iron status and PPD. Placentophagy advocates claim that the placenta provides an excellent source of dietary iron, and may therefore improve maternal postpartum iron status. However, a recent randomized, double-blind, placebo-controlled pilot study conducted by researchers at UNLV found that consuming a commonly recommended daily intake of encapsulated placenta (approximately 3,000 mg per day) only provides about one-quarter of the RDA for iron for lactating women. The study found no differences in maternal iron status over a three-week postpartum period between women consuming 3300 mg/day of cooked, encapsulated placenta, and study participants taking a placebo.

The placenta transports nutrients to the fetus during gestation. Proponents of modern placentophagy argue that the placenta retains some of these nutrients after delivery, and that consumption of the placenta by the mother will help her recover more quickly following childbirth by replenishing nutrients and hormones lost during parturition. One birthing website run by two Minnesota doulas lists possible health benefits including replenishing lost nutrients, increasing milk production, curbing postpartum depression and slowing postpartum hemorrhage. However, the placenta evolved to deliver the maximum amount of nutrients to the growing fetus, and is very efficient at not retaining them in order to maximize the baby's nutrition and growth.

Placenta contains high levels of CRH (corticotropin-releasing hormone), which releases the stress hormone cortisol from the adrenal glands. Though CRH is normally secreted by the hypothalamus, during pregnancy production of CRH by the placenta dramatically increases levels of CRH in the blood stream, which peak at delivery. Even postpartum, the placenta still contains very high levels of CRH, and some believe that it is beneficial to eat it. Studies on the effect of CRH primarily involve infusion of the hormone rather than ingestion.

Consumption of the placenta is also believed by the placentophagy community to cause the release of the chemical oxytocin in the brain.  Oxytocin stimulates uterine contractions leading to the onset of labor, and after childbirth can also cause the uterus to contract and sooner reach its pre-pregnancy size.

Preparation
In many areas placenta encapsulation specialists can be found to professionally prepare the placenta for consumption. Also, many online alternative health sources give instructions for preparing it personally.  One common method of preparation is encapsulation. The encapsulation process can be one of two ways: steamed or raw. With the steamed encapsulation process, the placenta is gently steamed with various herbs (ginger, lemon, frankincense, myrrh, etc.), then fully dehydrated, ground into a fine powder, and put into capsules. The raw method does not involve steaming first. The placenta will be fully dehydrated, then ground and put into capsules. Other options for placenta consumption are tinctures and smoothies. There are also meal recipes include lasagna, spaghetti, stew, and pizza.

Controversy
Many researchers remain skeptical of whether the practice of placentophagy is of value to humans. A 2015 review of the last 64 years of placentophagy research found that while a minority of women in western countries perceive placentophagy as reducing the risk of postpartum depression and enhancing recovery, there is really no evidence that this is the case. The same study also found inconclusive evidence that placentophagy was of any benefit to facilitating uterine contraction, resumption of normal cyclic estrogen cycle, and milk production. As well, the authors stated that the risks of placentophagy also warrant more investigation. A researcher who had previously researched why animals eat their placentas stated in 2007 that "people can believe what they want, but there’s no research to substantiate claims of human benefit. The cooking process will destroy all the protein and hormones.  Drying it out or freezing it would destroy other things." Two recent studies by researchers from the University of Nevada, Las Vegas, however, appear to be at odds with such claims. UNLV researchers found that some essential nutrients and steroid hormones remained in human placenta that was cooked and processed for encapsulation and consumption.

The fee charged by encapsulation specialists for processing human placenta in a woman's home is typically $60 - $200.

Although human placentophagy entails the consumption of human tissue by a human or humans, its status as cannibalism is debated.

Risks involved
There is a risk of spreading blood-borne illness, only present in cases of non-maternal placentophagy, where the mother's blood is shared with another human. As a meat, proper storage and preparation procedures must be followed to prevent bacterial infection in the placenta. Researchers assert that the risks of placenta consumption still warrant further investigation.

See also
 Fetal cannibalism

References

External links
 

Cultural anthropology
Alternative medicine
Carnivory
Cannibalism